The Inn is a river in Switzerland, Austria and Germany. It is a right tributary of the Danube and it is the third largest tributary of the Danube by discharge. The Engadine, the valley of the En, is the only Swiss valley whose waters end up in the Black Sea (via the Danube).

Etymology
The name Inn is derived from the old Celtic words en and enios, meaning water. In a document of 1338, the river was named Wasser (German for water). The first written mention from the years 105 to 109 (Publii Corneli Taciti historiarium liber tertius) reads: "... Sextilius Felix... ad occupandam ripam Aeni fluminis, quod Raetos Noricosque interfluit, missus..." ("... Sextilius Felix was sent to capture the banks of the Inn, which flows between the Rhaetian people and the Noric people.") The river is also mentioned by other authors of the Roman Empire as Ainos (Greek) or Aenus (Latin). In medieval Latin it was written as Enus or Oenus. The change in the old Bavarian language from e to i turned Enus to In. Until the 17th century, it was written like this or Yn, but also Ihn or Yhn. The double-n appeared only in the 16th century, for example in the Tyrolian Landreim of 1557, and since the 18th century this spelling and pronunciation with a short vowel has been customary.

The mentions in Roman times refer to the lower course. The Tyrolean section was first called Aenus by Venantius Fortunatus in the 6th century. The name Engadin and the Romansh name En indicate that the upper reaches of the river have always been called this way. Even though it was occasionally believed that the Inn originated near the Adige at the Reschen Pass, since the 16th century at the latest the origin has been seen uniformly in the area of the lakes at the Maloja Pass.

A connection may exist between the name Inn and the name of the French river Ain.

Geography
The source is located in the Swiss Alps, west of St. Moritz in the Engadine region, which is named after the river (Romansh Engiadina; Latin vallis Eniatina). Shortly after it leaves its source, the Inn flows through the largest lakes on its course, Lake Sils and Lake Silvaplana. It runs north-eastwards, entering Austria, and from Landeck eastwards through the Austrian state of Tyrol and its capital, Innsbruck (bridge over the Inn), and crosses the border into Bavaria near Kufstein.

On Bavarian territory the river runs northwards and passes Rosenheim, Wasserburg am Inn, and Waldkraiburg; then it turns east, runs through Mühldorf and Neuötting and is enlarged by two major tributaries, the Alz and the Salzach. From here to the Danube, it forms the border between Germany (Bavaria) and Austria (Upper Austria). Towns on this last section of the river are Marktl am Inn, Simbach on Inn, Braunau am Inn and Schärding.

In Passau the Inn finally enters the Danube (as does the river Ilz there). Although the Inn has a greater average flow than the Danube when they converge in Passau, and its watershed contains the Piz Bernina, the highest point in the Danube watershed, the Inn is considered a tributary of the Danube, which has a greater length, drains a larger surface area, and has a more consistent flow.
The Inn is the only river originating in Switzerland that ends in the Black Sea (via the Danube).

Tributaries

 Right tributaries (in downstream order): Flaz, Spöl, Clemgia, Faggenbach, Pitzbach, Ötztaler Ache, Melach, Sill, Ziller, Alpbach, Wildschönauer Ache, Brixentaler Ache, Weißache, Kaiserbach, Rohrdorfer Ache, Sims, Murn, Alz, Salzach, Enknach, Mattig, Ach, Hartbach, Antiesen, Pram
 Left tributaries (in downstream order; two different rivers called Rott exist): Beverin, Schergenbach, Sanna, Gurglbach, Höttinger Bach, Mühlauer Bach, Brandenberger Ache, Kieferbach, Auerbach, Kirchbach, Mangfall, Rott, Attel, Isen, Rott

Flow 

2013 flood 

On 3 June 2013 the discharge of the Inn in Passau reached  and the water levels reached , the highest recorded historic flood level since 1501. The historic centre of Passau, where the Danube, Inn and Ilz converge, was flooded severely.

Hydroelectric power plants 
Currently, there are 24 hydroelectric power plants on the Inn. 17 of them are operated by Verbund AG. The power plants are listed beginning at the headwaters:

References

External links

 

 
Rivers of Switzerland
Rivers of Bavaria
International rivers of Europe
Engadin
Rivers of Tyrol (state)
 
Austria–Germany border
Rivers of Graubünden
Braided rivers in Europe
Rivers of Austria
Rivers of Germany